The Hurst School, previously The Hurst Community College, is a state secondary school in the village of Baughurst, within the county of Hampshire in England. Jayne McLaren is the Headteacher and was appointed in January 2021. The school has just over 1,000 students.

The school provides secondary education for boys and girls aged from 11 to 16. It is categorized as a community school and is run wholly by the local education authority (LEA).

Pupils come from a catchment area which includes the nearby town of Tadley and the villages of Silchester, Bramley, Sherborne St John and Pamber Heath.

Curriculum 
The school teaches a variety of subjects which are examined  at GCSE level or through BTEC awards. Pupils follow the National Curriculum.

Performance 
The most recent OFSTED inspection took place in 2019. This was a short inspection where the school was judged to be 'Good'. The full inspection in May 2015 also judged the school as 'Good'. Feedback from the 2019 inspection included the following comments; Pupils are well behaved, confident and articulate. They explain their views thoughtfully and clearly. They are proud of the active role that they are encouraged to play in shaping the school community.” “The leadership team has ensured that all safeguarding arrangements are fit for purpose. These arrangements combine to create a culture of safeguarding throughout the school.”

OFSTED previously inspected the school in May 2001. They concluded that the school was "a very good school with some excellent features", which had improved significantly since the previous inspection in 1997.

Alumni

 Kathy Smallwood-Cook - Three-times an Olympic bronze medallist
 James Bye - actor

References

External links 
 The Hurst Community College (with Specialist Science Status), details about the school from the local education authority, Hampshire County Council.

Secondary schools in Hampshire
Community schools in Hampshire